Jindřich Maudr (10 January 1906 – 1 May 1990) was a Czech wrestler. He won an Olympic silver medal in Greco-Roman wrestling in 1928. He also competed at the 1932 Summer Olympics.

References

External links
 

1906 births
1990 deaths
Czech male sport wrestlers
Czechoslovak male sport wrestlers
Medalists at the 1928 Summer Olympics
Olympic medalists in wrestling
Olympic silver medalists for Czechoslovakia
Olympic wrestlers of Czechoslovakia
Sportspeople from Prague
Wrestlers at the 1928 Summer Olympics
Wrestlers at the 1932 Summer Olympics